Trump: An American Dream is a four-part British television documentary series, exploring the journey of Donald Trump through five decades, his public persona and career path leading up to his presidential run.   Trump: An American Dream first was released for UK television on Channel 4 in November 2017, followed by a global release on Netflix in March 2018. The documentary features original footage and interviews with early employees of The Trump Organization, addresses the business and personal relationship Trump had with his first wife, Ivana Trump, and covers the alliances Trump had with Roger Stone and Roy Cohn.

Cast
Nikki Haskell
Rona Barrett
Wayne Barrett
Ken Auletta
David Cay Johnston
Barbara Res
Geraldo Rivera

References

External links

2010s British documentary television series
2017 British television series debuts
2017 British television series endings
English-language television shows
Works about Donald Trump